Vishnugupta Candraditya (Gupta script:  Vi-ṣ-ṇu-gu-pta) was one of the lesser-known kings of the Gupta Dynasty. He is generally considered to be the last recognized king of the Gupta Empire. His reign lasted 10 years, from 540 to 550 CE. From the fragment of his clay sealing discovered at Nalanda during the excavations of 1927–28, it is revealed that he was the son of Kumaragupta III and the grandson of Narasimhagupta.

The last (the Damodarpur copper-plate inscription), in which he makes a land grant in the area of Kotivarsha (Bangarh in West Bengal) in 542/543 CE. This follows the occupation of most of northern and central India by the Aulikara ruler Yashodharman circa 532 CE.

According to a Nalanda seal,  Vishnugupta was son of Kumaragupta III, and grandson of Purugupta.

See also 
 Magadha
 Later Gupta dynasty

References

Gupta Empire
6th-century Indian monarchs